Common albatross may refer to:

Birds in the family Diomedeidae, the albatrosses
Butterflies of the genus Appias called albatrosses, and including:
Appias albina, of India, Southeast Asia and Australia
Appias paulina, found from India to Samoa
Appias sylvia, of Africa

Animal common name disambiguation pages